William Carvalho da Silva known as William (born November 16, 1954) is a Brazilian former volleyball player who competed in the 1976 Summer Olympics, in the 1980 Summer Olympics, in the 1984 Summer Olympics, and in the 1988 Summer Olympics.

He was born in São Paulo.

In 1976 he was part of the Brazilian team which finished seventh in the Olympic tournament. He played five matches.

Four years later he finished fifth with the Brazilian team in the 1980 Olympic tournament. He played all six matches.

At the 1984 Games he was a member of the Brazilian team which won the silver medal in the Olympic tournament. He played all six matches again.

His final Olympic appearance was in Seoul when he finished fourth with the Brazilian team in the 1988 Olympic tournament. He played all seven matches.

External links
 profile

1954 births
Living people
Sportspeople from São Paulo
Brazilian men's volleyball players
Olympic volleyball players of Brazil
Volleyball players at the 1976 Summer Olympics
Volleyball players at the 1980 Summer Olympics
Volleyball players at the 1984 Summer Olympics
Volleyball players at the 1988 Summer Olympics
Olympic silver medalists for Brazil
Olympic medalists in volleyball
Medalists at the 1984 Summer Olympics